Cannabis in the Democratic Republic of the Congo is legal for industrial, medicinal and scientific use. It continues to be illegal for recreational use.

Legalization of Medicinal Cannabis in the DRC 

On February 27, 2021, legalization to establish the conditions of operations regarding  narcotics and psychotropic substances exclusively for purposes that are medical was enacted in the DRC. Here are some highlights of the directive:

Article 1 
This legislation is intended to establish the conditions of operations regarding narcotics and psychotropic substances exclusively for purposes that are medical or scientific. The use of narcotic drugs and psychotropic substances is authorized solely and exclusively for medical or scientific purposes, therefore the crops, production, possession, use and marketing for purposes other than medical and scientific remain strictly prohibited.

Article 4  
The cultivation of plants that are considered a narcotic must meet the pharmaceutical requirements in line with current legislation in the Democratic Republic of Congo.

Article 5  
The cultivation of agricultural  narcotics of any type is exclusively for industrial purposes.

Article 6 
The land on which plants are grown that contain narcotic ingredients, must be clearly delineated. Any increase in this area is subject to authorization from the Minister of Health.

Article 7 
Authorization for the cultivation of crops that contain narcotic substances is exclusively granted by the Minister of Health.

Article 13 
Cultivation of crops that contain narcotic substances is exclusively intended for industrial cultivation.

Article 14 
The production authorization is granted by the minister of public health

Article 23 
The authorization for the cultivation and  production is granted for a period of five years and renewable unless waived, suspended or withdrawn.

All authorizations for  renewal of  cultivation  or  production is the subject of a written request of the holder of the authorization to the Minister in charge of  Public  Health and shall be applied for at the  latest six months before the expiration of the current authorization.

Licensing 
The first licence granted to cultivate and export medicinal cannabis was issued  to TMIG/Instadose Pharma DRC.

History
Cannabis may have been introduced to the Congo region in the 1850s, carried there by Swahili traders from Zanzibar. In the 1880s, the Beni Diamba (People of Cannabis) movement popularized ritual use of cannabis in southwest Congo.

Economy
Cannabis is the only drug produced locally in the DRC (which is one of the largest producers in Africa) and is primarily for local consumption, though smaller amounts are smuggled to France and Belgium.

References

Democratic Republic of the Congo
Drugs in the Democratic Republic of the Congo